Sarin Ronnakiat (born 4 January 1995 in Thailand), nickname Inn, is a Thai actor.

Early life 
Sarin was born in Bangkok. He is the middle son of his family.,surrounded by two sisters. The family work is in real estate.

He studied at Sarin Secondary education at Bangkok Christian College Higher education at the Faculty of Architecture Architectural Design (International Program)/International Program in Design & Architecture (INDA) Chulalongkorn University 2nd Class Honors.

While studying in South Korea he performed the test of the show.

Career 
He was first known as a hot boy from Chulalongkorn University. After graduation he entered the entertainment industry, starting as a Get 102.5 DJ. He became an actor, appearing in Duang Jai Nai Fai Nhao.

In 2019 Sarin appeared in the drama series The Man Series Episode Pupa , portraying "Pupa". He played Perm in the drama Thong Eak Mor Ya Tah Chaloang and received a role in Fak Fah Kiri Dao.

Filmography

Television series

Concert 
 Channel 3 Super Fan Live!: SUPERNOVA Universe Explosion Concert

MC
 Online 
 2020 : อยู่บ้านอิน On Air YouTube:StayINN
 2020 : StayINN On Air YouTube:StayINN

Recogniion 

 Kazz Awards 2019 Best “Cute Boy of the Years (2019)

References

External links 
 
 

1995 births
Living people
Sarin Ronnakiat
Sarin Ronnakiat
Sarin Ronnakiat
Sarin Ronnakiat
Sarin Ronnakiat
Sarin Ronnakiat
Sarin Ronnakiat
Sarin Ronnakiat
Sarin Ronnakiat
Thai television personalities
Sarin Ronnakiat